Ptyssiglottis is a genus of flowering plants belonging to the family Acanthaceae.

Its native range is Tropical Asia.

Species:

Ptyssiglottis auriculata 
Ptyssiglottis bantamensis 
Ptyssiglottis campanulata 
Ptyssiglottis caudata 
Ptyssiglottis chrysea 
Ptyssiglottis creaghii 
Ptyssiglottis cuprea 
Ptyssiglottis cyrtandroides 
Ptyssiglottis decurrens 
Ptyssiglottis densiflora 
Ptyssiglottis dulcamarioides 
Ptyssiglottis fastidiosa 
Ptyssiglottis fusca 
Ptyssiglottis gibbsiae 
Ptyssiglottis glabrisepala 
Ptyssiglottis glandulifera 
Ptyssiglottis granulata 
Ptyssiglottis hallieri 
Ptyssiglottis hirsuta 
Ptyssiglottis isophylla 
Ptyssiglottis kunthiana 
Ptyssiglottis lanceolata 
Ptyssiglottis longisepala 
Ptyssiglottis maxima 
Ptyssiglottis mucronata 
Ptyssiglottis nigrescens 
Ptyssiglottis peranthera 
Ptyssiglottis picta 
Ptyssiglottis psychotriifolia 
Ptyssiglottis pubescens 
Ptyssiglottis pubisepala 
Ptyssiglottis rubrolutea 
Ptyssiglottis salicifolia 
Ptyssiglottis sanguinolenta 
Ptyssiglottis staminodifera 
Ptyssiglottis subcordata 
Ptyssiglottis undulata

References

Acanthaceae
Acanthaceae genera